The Al-Ahram International is a men's squash tournament held in the Giza Plateau just in front of the pyramids in Cairo, Egypt. It is part of the PSA Super Series, the highest level of men's professional squash competition. The event was founded in 1996.

Past results

Men's

Women's

Source:

References

External links
Official website
PSA Al-Ahram International 2000

Squash tournaments in Egypt
Squash in Egypt